The 2017 South Dakota Coyotes football team represented the University of South Dakota in the 2017 NCAA Division I FCS football season. They were led by second-year head coach Bob Nielson and played their home games in the DakotaDome. They were a member of the Missouri Valley Football Conference. They finished the season 8–5, 4–4 in MVFC play to finish in a three-way tie for fifth place. They received an at-large bid to the FCS Playoffs, which was the schools first ever FCS Playoff bid, where they defeated Nicholls State in the first round before losing to Sam Houston State in the second round.

Schedule

Ranking movements

References

South Dakota
South Dakota Coyotes football seasons
South Dakota
South Dakota Coyotes football